Airamanna is a Neotropical genus  in the family Lycaenidae.

Species
Airamanna columbia (Bálint, 2005)
Airamanna rhapsodia (Bálint, 2005)
Airamanna rhaptissima (K. Johnson, 1991)

References

 , 2005: A review of the Neotropical hairstreak genus Annamaria with notes on further genera (Lepidoptera: Lycaenidae). Annales historico-naturales Musei nationalis hungarici, 97: 115–149. Full article: .
 , 2009: Five chapters on Annamaria Columbia with the description of a new genus (Lepidoptera: Lycaenidae: Eumaeini). Boletín Científico Centro de Museos Museo de Historia Natural 13 (1): 75–82. Full article: 
 ,  1991: Types of Neotropical Theclinae (Lycaenidae) in the Museum National d'Histoire Naturelle, Paris. Journal of the Lepidopterists' Society, 45 (2): 142–157. Full article: 

Eumaeini
Lycaenidae of South America